Victor A. Pogadaev  (born November 20, 1946 in Sakmara, Orenburg Oblast, Russia) is a Russian historian, orientalist, and translator. He specializes in the history and culture of South-East Asia and translates literary works from Malay and Indonesian into Russian and vice versa. He is also a noted lexicographer.

Biography
In 1964 he graduated from Sakmarskaya high school with a gold medal. In 1964–1965 he worked as a teacher of German in Krasnokommunarskaya 8-year school at Sakmarskaya Station. In 1965–1970 years he was a student of Indonesian branch of the Institute of Oriental Languages, Lomonosov Moscow State University, graduating it with excellence. In 1970–1971 was studying Malay at the University of Malaya (Kuala Lumpur) in the first group of Russian students through the student exchange. In 1975 finished post-graduate studies at the Institute of Asian and African Studies of Lomonosov Moscow State University and in 1976 got PhD in History with the theses  "Opposition Parties of Malaysia” (1957–1971). In 1977–1982 he worked under the Ministry of Foreign Affairs of the USSR in the Soviet Embassy in Indonesia, in 1986–1989 in the Soviet Embassy in Malaysia. Since 1989 he was an editor- consultant of the sector "Encyclopedia of Asia” at the Institute of Oriental Studies, Russian Academy of Science, in 1996–2001 worked as a lecturer of Indonesian language at the Institute of Asian and African Studies, in 1998–2001 simultaneously as the Deputy Head of Information and Analytical Center of "Evening Moscow" Concern. Since September 2001 – the Lecturer of Russian Language and Russian Culture at the Faculty of Languages and Linguistics, University of Malaya in Kuala Lumpur, Malaysia, since 2003 – Assoc. Professor.

In 1998–2001 he was the representative of Russia in «Experpta Indonesica» (Leiden).  He is currently a Corresponding Member of International Teacher’s Training Academy of Science (2006), a Vice-President of the Nusantara Society, an expert of ASEAN Centre at Moscow State Institute of International Relations, a member of the Editorial Team of the journal «Folklore and Folkloristics» (India),  a member of the Editorial Board of International Review of Humanities Studies (Jakarta), a member of International Advisory Board of International Journal of Islamic Thought (Malaysia, 2020), a life member of the Association of Modern Languages (Malaysia), a member of the International Council on Malay Language (Kuala Lumpur).

Main publications

 Малайзийско-русско-английский словарь (Malay-Russian-English Dictionary). M.: Russky Yazik, 1977, 400 pp. (in collaboration with N. V. Rott and A. P. Pavlenko).
 (ed). Человек из легенды. К 150-летию со дня рождения Н. Н. Миклухо-Маклая (A Man from the Legend. In Commomoration of the 150th Anniversary of N.N. Miklukho-Maclay). Малайско-индонезийские исследования (Malay-Indonesian Studies) VIII. M.: Krasnaya Gora, 1997, 68 pp.
 (ed). Национальное строительство и литературный/ культурный процесс в Юго-Восточной Азии (National Building and Literary/Cultural Processes in South-East Asia). Малайско — индонезийские исследования (Malay-Indonesian Studies) IX. M.: Krasnaya Gora, 1997, 408 pp.
 (ed.) Малайско-индонезийские исследования (Malay-Indonesian Studies), вып. 12. М.: Muravei-Guide, 1999, 192 pp.
 «Language Situation and Language Policy in Southeast Asia». — Parangalcang Brother Andrew. Festschrift for Andrew Gonzales on His Sixtieth Birthday. Editors: Ma Lourdes S. Bautista, Teodoro A. Liamzon, Bonifacio P. Sibayan. Linguistic Society of the Philippines. Manila, 2000, pp. 213–225. (in collaboration with V. A. Makarenko).
 (trans)  Leo Tolstoy. Haji Murat. Kuala Lumpur: DBP, 2001, 242 pp. 
 Penyair Agung Rusia Pushkin dan Dunia Timur (The Great Russian Poet Pushkin and the Oriental World). Monograph Series. Centre For Civilisational Dialogue. University Malaya. N 6, 2003, 64 pp. 
 «Russian Chastushka and Malay Pantun».— Folcloristics: In Search of Root. A Felicitation Volume published to Celebrate the 70th Birth Anniversary of Dr. Subhash Chandra Bandopadhyay. Kolkata, 2008, 319—333.
 (trans)  Mawar Emas. Bunga Rampai Sastera Rusia (Golden Rose. Anthology of Russian Literature). Penyelenggara dan Penterjemah Victor Pogadaev. Kuala Lumpur: Institut Terjemahan Negara Malaysia, 2009. .
 Kamus Rusia-Indonesia, Indonesia-Rusia (Russian-Indonesian, Indonesian-Russian Dictionary). Jakarta: Gramedia Pustaka Utama, 2010, 1324 pp. 
 Малайский мир: Бруней, Индонезия, Малайзия, Сингапур. Лингвострановедческий словарь (Malay World: Brunei, Indonesia, Malaysia, Singapore. Lingua-Cultural Dictionary). Свыше 9000 словарных статей. M.: Vostochnaya Kniga, 2012, pp. 798. 
 Малайзийская оппозиция в борьбе за независимость страны и социальныйпрогресс: 1940-1970-е годы (Malaysian Opposition in the Struggle for Independence and Social Progress: Years 1940–1970). M: Klyuch-S, 2014, 160 pp. 
 Wajah Sarjana Pengajian Melayu Rusia (Faces of Scholars of Malay Studies in Russia). Kuala Lumpur: DBP, 2015, 174 pp. .
Новый малайско-русский и русско-малайский словарь. Факультет языков и лингвистики Университета Малайя. Около 70 000 слов. Консультант — профессор Зурайда Мохд. Дон (A new Malay-Russian, Russian-Malay Dictionary. Faculty of Languages and Linguistics, University of Malaya, about 70 000 words. Consultant Prof. Zuraidah Mohd. Don). М.: Издательство «Ключ-С», 2016, 816 с. .
 Большой малайско-русский словарь (Big Malay-Russian Dictionary). Около 60 тыс. слов. Консультант Асмах Хаджи Омар. M.: Klyuch-S, 2013, 1024 pp.  (in collaboration with T.V. Dorofeeva and E.S. Kukushkina).
 Vseobshie Vibori kak Otrazhenie Borbi za Vlast v Malayzii (General Elections as a Reflection of the Struggle for Power in Malaysia) // Power and Society in Southeast Asia. History and Modernity. Moscow: Lomonosov Moscow State University, 2015, p. 215-232. 
 Кристанг-Русский Словарь (Около 4000 слов). Papiah Kristang-Russio Dictionario (Approximo 4000 palabra). M.: Klyuch-S, 2016, 88 pp.  (in collaboration with Joan Margaret Marbeck)
 (ed., trans., preface). В поисках мечты: современная поэзия Индонезии в переводах Виктора Погадаева (In Search of Dreams: Modern Indonesian Poetry in the translation of Victor Pogadaev). M.: Klyuch-S, Jakarta: HW Project, 2016. 96 pp. , 
 Cultural Development in South-East Asia: Looking Forward Looking Back // Межцивилизационные контакты в странах Юго-Восточной Азии. Исторические перспективы и глобализация. Сборник статей (Intercivilizational Contacts in the Countries of Southeast Asia. Historical Perspectives and Globalization. Collection of Articles). С-Пб, 2017, с. 141-164.
Dragons Images in Russian Folklore // Folklore and Folkloristics. Kolkota, Vol. 10:2 December 2017, p. 15-27.
"Малайзия. Возвращение Махатхира" (Malaysia: The Return of Mahathir) // “Азия и Африка сегодня" (Asia and Africa Today), No. 9, 2018, p. 40-44.
Russia - Malaysia: Credentials of Literatures (On Mutual Translations and the Impact of Russian Literature) // Malay-Indonesian Studies. Issue XX. Editors V.A. Pogadaev, V.V. Sikorsky. M .: Nusantara Society, Institute of Oriental Studies, Russian Academy of Sciences, 2018, p. 83-105.
Погадаев В.А. Творческие поиски Анвара Ридвана //Малайско-индонезийские исследования. Выпуск XXI. К 80-летию А.К. Оглоблина. Редакторы-составители В.В. Сикорский, В.А. Погадаев. М.: Общество "Нусантара", 2019, с. 137-142 (Pogadaev V.A. Creative Searching of Anwar Ridhwan // Malay-Indonesian Studies. Issue XXI. Festschrift inHonor of Prof. Alexander K. Ogloblin on the Occasion of his 80th Birthday. Editors-compilers V.V. Sikorsky, V.A. Pogadaev. M.: Nusantara Society, 2019, p. 137-142).

Awards and honours 

 Sumbangsih (Prize) Prima Comexindo (1998, Indonesia-Rusia)
 Diploma of Honour by the Russian Ministry of Foreign Affairs for contribution to development of cultural relations between Russia and Malaysia (2005)
 Two bronze medals at the Expo of Research, Invention and Innovation (2007, Malaysia) 
 International Prize Numera’s Man of Letters (Malaysia, 2013)
 Diploma of Honour by the Federal Agency for the Commonwealth of Independent States, Compatriots Living Abroad and International Humanitarian Cooperation (Rossotrudnichestvo) (2014)
 Literary Award 2017 by A Poetry Initiative of Bangladesh (Kathak) "In Appreciation of Outstanding Contribution, Initiative and Deep Commitment to National and World literature" (3.2.2017)
Honorary Diploma of the Nicholas Roerich International Prize 2018 in the nomination "Formation of the cultural image of the country in the world" 
Certificate of thanks and appreciation "For Contribution to the Development of the Russian State Library" by the Director General of the Library V.V. Duda (September 12, 2019)

Bibliography
 Pogadaev Viktor Aleksandrovič. -  Biographischer Index Rußlands und der Sowjetunion / Biographical Index of Russia and the Soviet Union. Compiled by Axel Frey. München: Walter de Gruyter, 2005, p. 1624. , 9783110933369
  Pogadaev, Victor Alexandrovich. — Who’s Who in the World 2010. 27th Edition. New Providence, NJ: Marquis Who’Who, p. 2156.
 Pogadaev, Dr. V. - Guide to Asian Studies in Europe. International Institute of Asian Studies (IIAS). Routledge, 2014, p. 79.

See also
Jonathan Edward. The Russian who fell in love with Malaysia… and became a writer in Malay. Malay Mail, 3 February 2018 
 Svetlana Kovaleva.Tribute to NST columnist Pogadaev // New Straits Times, November 20, 2021

References

Living people
1946 births
Russian orientalists
Russian lexicographers
20th-century Russian historians
Russian translators
21st-century Russian historians